Road 62 is a road connecting the province of Loristan to Isfahan and Mashhad, in Iran.

References

External links 

 Iran road map on Young Journalists Club

62
Transportation in Isfahan Province
Transportation in Lorestan Province